Two ships of the United States Navy have been named USS Corsair, for
the California rockfish, or a pirate or privateer, especially Turkish or Saracen.

  was built as the private yacht Corsair III in 1898, and was acquired and commissioned by the Navy on 15 May 1917. Cross referencing DANFS also finds the names, USC&GS Oceanographer (OSS-26), USS Natchez (PG-85) and USS Oceanographer (AGS-3). as being held by this same ship.
  1946, was a  that served during the early years of the Cold War.

See also
 USS Corsair, a fictitious submarine in the 1943 movie Crash Dive

Sources

United States Navy ship names